Aberdeen Football Club were a Scottish football team formed in 1881. On 14 April 1903 they merged with the two other Aberdeen clubs Victoria United and Orion to form the current Aberdeen Football Club.

The club's first-ever game was a 1–4 defeat at Coupar Angus. Aberdeen played their first Scottish Cup tie against Dundee Harp in 1882. The club won its first trophy in 1888, the Aberdeenshire Cup. In 1891, Aberdeen became a founder member of the newly formed Northern League.

Stadium

On 1 February 1899, the club moved into Pittodrie Stadium which had previously been a dung hill for the city's police horses. They had previously played at Holburn Cricket Ground, the Aberdeen Grammar School grounds and The Chanonry.

Playing colours

For most of their history (1888 to 1903), the club's colours were white shirt, blue short, and blue socks.

Scottish Cup Record

1882–83

1883–84

1884–85

1885–86

1886–87

1887–88

1888–89

1889–90

1890–91

1891–92

1892–93

Aberdeen F.C. Sevens 

The football club ran a Sports Day from 1887 at its Chanonry Ground. In 1889 it introduced rugby sevens as one of the various sports in its Sports Day. The Sports Day concept proved so popular that it often was spread over a week, resulting in a Finals day on the Saturday with prizes awarded.

Thus Aberdeen was the first place outside of the Scottish Borders to host a Sevens tournament, barring a few isolated sevens matches in England.

The club ran its Sports Day with a rugby sevens tournament included to 1893; with Aberdeen University RFC winning all but one tournament. From 1894 the rugby sevens tournament was dropped from its Sports Day.

Honours 

 Aberdeenshire Cup
 1887–88, 1888–89, 1889–90, 1897–98, 1901–02

 Aberdeen Charity Cup
 1892–93

References

Aberdeen F.C.
Defunct football clubs in Scotland
Association football clubs established in 1881
Association football clubs disestablished in 1903
Football clubs in Aberdeen
1881 establishments in Scotland
1903 disestablishments in Scotland